Al Wahda Mall (Arabic: الوحدة مول) is a shopping center located in Abu Dhabi, United Arab Emirates. The mall's construction started in the year 2004, but its completion date is unknown. Opened on 5 June 2007, this mall is owned by Al Wahda Sports Club, Abu Dhabi, and managed by Lulu Group International. It is located along Old Airport Road (Sheikh Rashid Bin Saeed Street) near Hazza' Bin Zayed The First Street.

About 
As of 2023, this mall has a size of 3.3 million square feet (307,000 square meters) in total area, with over 350 brand stores, and over 20 million visits annually. This mall also holds many awards, such as "Best Shopping Mall in Abu Dhabi”, multiple Gold & Silver Awards, etc. Apart from that, Grand Millennium, a 5-star hotel, is connected directly to and from the mall.

Extension 
The mall's extension opened publicly on 5th September 2012, with more than 200 stores newly opened and after leasing more than 90% of retail space. From its appearance, it's a separate building with another valet parking below the main sky bridge that connects the two buildings. The main sky bridge contains some shops and most of the floors.

References

External links
Official website
Grand Millennium Al Wahda

Tourist attractions in Abu Dhabi
Shopping malls in Abu Dhabi